Karin Haftenberger (born 3 June 1948) is an East German sprint canoeist who competed in the late 1960s. She won a bronze medal in the K-4 500 m event at the 1966 ICF Canoe Sprint World Championships in East Berlin.

Haftenberger also finished fifth in the K-2 500 m event at the 1968 Summer Olympics in Mexico City.

References

Sports-reference.com profile

1948 births
Canoeists at the 1968 Summer Olympics
German female canoeists
Living people
Olympic canoeists of East Germany
ICF Canoe Sprint World Championships medalists in kayak